Union sportive de la médina d'Alger is a professional football club based in Algiers, Algeria, which plays in Algerian Ligue Professionnelle 1.
This chronological list comprises all those who have held the position of manager of the first team of USM Alger from 1962, when the first professional manager was appointed, to the present day. Each manager's entry includes his dates of tenure and the club's overall competitive record (in terms of matches won, drawn and lost), honours won and significant achievements while under his care. Caretaker managers are included, where known. As of the start of the 2021–22 season, USM Alger have had 61 full-time managers.

Background

After independence USM Alger brought former Nice and Monaco player Abdelaziz Ben Tifour to be a coach and player at the same time, he led the club to win its first Critérium d'Honneur title against MC Alger in a match in which he scored a goal. In the early 1980s, USMA contracted Ali Benfadah, and after seven Algerian Cup finals, it eventually led him to win the first cup in 1981. From the 1986–87 season, the team's son Djamel Keddou became the new coach, with Mustapha Aksouh as his assistant. and despite the lack of experience, weak abilities and a young team, he managed to win the Algerian Cup title in 1988 against CR Belouizdad for the second time in its history. The club then fell into the second division, where he suffered instability at the level of the technical bar and after the advent of Saïd Allik as chairman of the board of directors, and who contracted with the young coach Younes Ifticène to obtain promotion to the first division, which was achieved in the 1994–95 season. Ifticen left USM Alger despite achieving the underlined goal of being replaced by Nour Benzekri who didn't stay long and left because of his disagreement with Azzedine Rahim, where Mustapha Aksouh ended the season and led him to win the first Championship title in 33 years. In the 1997–98 season, Younès Ifticen returned again where he achieved a feat with him in the Champions League and failed to reach the final by a goal difference. In Division 1 USM Alger reached the final against USM El Harrach despite progressing in the result with two goals, but in the last 20 minutes the team conceded three goals, at the end The match was blamed on the coach mostly after taking out the two scorers.

In the 2002–03 season, USM Alger hired a young coach Azzedine Aït Djoudi, who achieved a great feat by winning the league and cup double for the first time in the club's history. And eliminated in the semi-final of the Cup Winners' Cup against Wydad AC. Despite the success, Aït Djoudi did not end his career with the club and left to be replaced by Mourad Abdelouahab, the latter despite the good results and played in the semi-finals of the Champions League, but left while the team was in second place, only to be temporarily replaced by Aksouh until the end of the season and led him to win the Algerian Cup. Once again the start of the season with a new coach, to which Noureddine Saâdi returned, expressing his satisfaction at once again taking over the destinies of the Algiers club for next season. Despite the good results, he left at the end of the match go and the team was in the lead, and Djamel Menad came in his place left after the bad results and elimination of the Confederation Cup, according to Menad his decision is motivated by "personal reasons" which he does not want to spread in the public square. “After careful consideration, I have decided to leave my post. The reasons for this decision I prefer to keep to myself, but know that they have nothing to do with the latest results of the team”. Once again Aksouh finishes the season and wins the championship title with ease. After that, the club entered a void, despite its contract with known coaches like Mustapha Biskri, Rachid Belhout, Abdelkader Amrani and Kamel Mouassa, and even foreigners, namely René Lobello and Oscar Fulloné and this until the end of the era of President Allik.

After the vacancy of the coaching position following the departure of Mouassa, Noureddine Saâdi has just formalized his return to the Red and black. Indeed, after an initial contact with President Allik, he led the team until the end of the season despite financial problems, and with the advent of ETRHB Haddad, Saâdi was relieved of his functions to be replaced by the Frenchman Hervé Renard with a clause in his contract allowing him to leave if he is requested by a national selection. With the start of the 2012–13 season, the USMA signed a contract with the Argentinian Miguel Angel Gamondi. and after the poor results he was dismissed from his position and replaced by the former coach of Olympique de Marseille Rolland Courbis as new coach. The goal is to return the club to the track of titles, and with the weakness of USMA's chances of achieving the Ligue 1, its focus has become on the Algerian Cup to reach the Final and in the Algiers Derby, Courbis won the first title in its coaching career, which is the first for USMA in 8 years. A week later won another title, this time the UAFA Club Cup after defeating Al-Arabi SC. Despite the confidence placed by the administration in Corbis, he decided to leave and terminated his contract in agreement with USMA. A month later Courbis joined his former club Montpellier. Hubert Velud has become the new coach of USM Alger replacing his compatriot Courbis, last season's champion with ES Setif until the end of the season, with the possibility of extending him in the event of good results. Velud won his first title in the Super Cup against ES Setif. the start in Ligue 1 was more than wonderful as USM Alger did not lose in any match until the end of Season Sixteen victory, including eight consecutive to win the Ligue 1 easily, it is his second title this season. After a series of bad results and from 15 matches he won in only five, USM Alger decided to dismiss Velud, although his career was successful during which he achieved two titles in a year and a half.

After the departure of the French coaches Rolland Courbis and Hubert Velud, USM Alger signed a contract with the German Otto Pfister and due to the poor results he was removed from his position. At the end of the season, the club started looking for a new coach where they tried to sign Djamel Belmadi, but the latter refused. USM Alger have decided to put their faith in assistant coach Miloud Hamdi, who succeeded what others failed by taking the club to the 2015 CAF Champions League Final for the first time in its history. Hamdi showed great abilities despite having doubts about his abilities, and concluded the season with the Ligue 1 title, and despite this, at the end of the season he left. On August 5, 2020, USM Alger officially announced François Ciccolini as the club's new coach, and its technical staff will be Benaraibi Bouziane as first assistant, former international Mohamed Benhamou as goalkeeping coach, Nicolas Baup as physical trainer and Sylvain Matrisciano as coach of the under-21s. After losing the Super Cup final, USM Alger decided to sack Ciccolini from his position because he had not made it to the podium to receive the medal, which was considered as an insult to an official body that was Prime Minister Abdelaziz Djerad. On 5 December, 2020 USMA agreed with former club coach Thierry Froger to lead the first team for one season after a consultation with Antar Yahia and some lead players. On 7 March, 2021 due to the poor results Froger and his assistant Bouziane were sacked and replaced by the former coach last season Mounir Zeghdoud.

Achour Djelloul reveals that Denis Lavagne will be the new coach of Soustara's, Azzedine Rahim as assistant and Lounès Gaouaoui as goalkeepers coach. On December 25, 2021 USM Alger decided to terminate the contract with Lavagne due to poor results. Hocine Achiou the sporting director stated that they will not rush to sign a new coach, who should be worthy of the club's philosophy, Lavagne asked for 198,000 euros after unilateral termination of the contract or to go to FIFA, interim coach Azzedine Rahim stated that he does not want to burn the stages and in order to be a head coach you must go through several stages. After the end of the first stage led by a temporary coach for more than a month, USM Alger contracted with Serbian Zlatko Krmpotić with Moroccan assistant Djamil Ben Ouahi, Krmpotić who has coached several clubs in Africa, will sign a 6-month contract and could be renewed in the event of a place in the league standings at the end of the season. 

On April 18, 2022 after the defeat against MC Oran, Krmpotić was dismissed from his position and USM Alger decided to rely on his assistant Djamil Ben Ouahi to complete the season. His start was good as Benouahi led the club to its first victory after two months, after which in the Algiers Derby, Benouahi achieved an important and unexpected victory that allows the club to search for a continental participation, and after the fifth win in a row Benouahi stated that he wishes to stay in the club, but the decision is up to them and that he has become a fan of this team. On July 6, 2022, Benouahi extended his contract for another year to remain the head coach for the new season. USM Alger delegation expected to move to Antalya, Turkey, to take a 14-day preparatory training for the start of the season. But on the day of travel coach Jamil Benouahi and some players refused to travel because of their financial dues, immediately after that USM Alger administration decided to dismiss the coach from his position. The next day 14 players, fitness coach Kamel Boudjenane and goalkeeping coach Lounès Gaouaoui signed a document that refused to dismiss Benouahi and demanded the departure of some of those in the administration and the assistant coach Sofiane Benkhelifa who was appointed by the administration. 

On August 4, 2022, USMA contracted with Boualem Charef to be the new coach with his staff. On November 7, 2022 USM Alger announced to the public opinion that it had settled the case of coach Denis Lavagne by paying the full financial dues he demanded through "FIFA", USMA considered that the case of Lavane is from the "past", and this file was finally closed after transferring the funds to his account within the legal deadlines set by the "FIFA". Boualem Charef received a lot of criticism from USMA supporters because of the performance, which did not convince them. Charef stated that the players do not have consistency between them and he does not have enough time to gather them all because of the Algeria A' national team that was preparing for the CHAN 2022, Where was the coach Madjid Bougherra summoning 9 players for evry preparatory internship. On December 25, 2022, USM Alger terminated the contract with Charef, with three months compensation.

Managerial history
Below is a list of USM Alger coaches from 1962 until the present day.
<div style="font-size:100%">

List of managers
Information correct as of 24 December 2022. Only competitive matches are counted.

Trophies

Bold = current manager

Managers

See also
USM Alger
List of USM Alger players

References

USM Alger
USM Alger
USM Alger